, located in Setagaya, Tokyo, is the Shinto shrine that is dedicated to the deified spirit of Yoshida Shōin, an activist during the Edo era.

History
Shoin was executed by the Shogunate in prison in Tenmacho, Edo in 1859, his body was reburied in Wakabayashi by his followers in 1863. The shrine was erected in 1882, and the current main shrine building was built in 1927.

Shrine complex

Gallery

See also

 List of Shinto shrines

References

External links
 

1882 establishments in Japan
Religious buildings and structures completed in 1927
Buildings and structures in Setagaya
Shinto shrines in Tokyo